Matthew Charles Katula (born August 22, 1982 in Brookfield, Wisconsin) is a former American football long snapper. He was signed by the Baltimore Ravens as undrafted free agent in 2005. He played college football at Wisconsin.

He was also a member of the New England Patriots, Minnesota Vikings and Pittsburgh Steelers.

Early years
Katula attended Catholic Memorial High School in Waukesha, Wisconsin and was a letterman in football. As a senior, he won first-team All-Conference honors on offense, and second-team All-Conference honors on defense as a linebacker. His younger brother, Sam, was a standout basketball player at UW Parkside.

College career
Katula attended the University of Wisconsin–Madison, where he redshirted as a freshman in 2000. He went on to long snap for the Badgers in his final four seasons, playing in 48 of 51 possible games.

Professional career

Baltimore Ravens

Katula joined the Baltimore Ravens as an undrafted free agent on April 29, 2005. In 2005 and 2006, he played in every regular season game. In 2005, he recorded 10 special teams tackles, the most by a long snapper. After playing in every game again in 2007, Katula was signed by the Ravens to a five-year contract extension on September 6, 2008. He played in every game again in 2008 and 2009. In 2010, he lost his long snapping job to rookie Morgan Cox and was released on August 13, 2010.

New England Patriots
The New England Patriots signed Katula on November 10, 2010, after waiving former long snapper Jake Ingram. He played in the final eight games of the season for the Patriots. He was waived on August 29, 2011.

Minnesota Vikings
On November 29, 2011, Katula signed with the Minnesota Vikings to replace the injured Cullen Loeffler. He performed the Vikings' long-snapping duties in the team's final five games.

Pittsburgh Steelers
Katula signed with Pittsburgh on June 13, 2012.

External links
New England Patriots bio

1982 births
Living people
People from Brookfield, Wisconsin
Sportspeople from Waukesha, Wisconsin
Players of American football from Wisconsin
American football long snappers
Wisconsin Badgers football players
Baltimore Ravens players
New England Patriots players
Minnesota Vikings players
Sportspeople from the Milwaukee metropolitan area